The Huddersfield Central Cricket League was a cricket league featuring teams in and around the town of Huddersfield, West Yorkshire, England between 1913 and 2016.

The league was founded in December 1913. The league's first matches, with 9 member teams, began in May 1914. Primrose Hill was the first champion.

In 1919. the league amalgamated with the Holme and Dearne Valley League after some founder clubs left to join the Huddersfield District League.

Teams in this league were based in the town of Huddersfield, in the Colne and Holme Valleys surrounding the town, from the Spen Valley, from the nearby city of Wakefield and South Yorkshire towns of Penistone and Barnsley.

In 1928 a knockout competition was held for the 1st XI teams called the Holden Cup. The first winners were Skelmanthorpe. It was renamed the Allsop Cup in 1952 in honour of former Cumberworth United player Friend Allsop. Scholes won this competition a record 9 times.

The knockout competition for 2nd XI teams called the Tinker Cup and was first held in 1929. Denby Dale won this competition the most times, six. 

The league celebrated its centenary in 2013  and was dissolved after the 2016 season with Mount CC from Batley being the final champion team, winning section A.

Throughout the league's history, clubs have been joining and leaving other nearby cricket leagues. The league's former teams now play in the Huddersfield, the Halifax, the Barnsley and the Pontefract & District Cricket Leagues.

Teams in the final 2016 season

 Almondburians
 Augustinians
 Birchencliffe
 Bradley & Colne
 Calder Grove
 Cartworth Moor
 Denby Grange
 Edgerton & Dalton
 Flockton
 Green Moor
 Higham
 Holmbridge
 Horbury Bridge
 Leymoor
 Mount
 Nortonthorpe

Former League Teams

 Almondbury
 Almondbury Wesleyians
 Armitage Bridge
 Azaad
 Badger Hill
 Birkby Former Members Association (FMA)
 Birkby Rose Hill
 Bretton
 British Dyes Company
 Broad Oak
 Cawthorne
 Clayton West
 Crigglestone
 Crossbank Methodists
 Cumberworth United
 David Browns
 Denby
 Denby Dale
 Denby Grange
 Dewsbury Moorlands
 Dodworth
 Emley Clarence
 Gawthorpe St Marys
 Hall Bower
 Harry Lime
 Heckmondwike & Carlinghow
 Hepworth
 Honley Wesleyians
 Hoylandswaine
 International Caribbean
 Karrier Carworks
 Kexborough
 Lepton Highlanders
 Mirfield
 Meltham
 Moldgreen WMC
 Netherton
 Overthorpe
 Penistone
 Penistone Netherfield
 Penistone Sports
 Penistone YS
 Primrose Hill
 Rowley Hill
 Ruddlesdens
 St Andrews
 Salendine Nook Baptists
 Salendine Nook Old Boys (SNOBs)
 Scholes
 Shelley
 Shepley
 Silkstone United
 Skelmanthorpe
 Thongsbridge
 Thornhil & Westborough
 Thurstonland
 Upperthong
 Upper Cumberworth
 Upper Hopton
 Westborough
 Woodfield Park
 Woolley Miners Welfare
 YMCA

References

Cricket in West Yorkshire